San Jose and Randall station is a light rail stop on the Muni Metro J Church line, located in the median of San Jose Avenue at the north end of the Bernal Cut in the Bernal Heights neighborhood of San Francisco, California. The stop has two side platforms, each with an accessible mini-high platform.

The stop is also served by bus routes  and  plus the  route which provides service along the J Church line during the early morning when trains do not operate.

J Church and N Judah trains began using the extension of the J Church line along San Jose Avenue for carhouse moves on August 31, 1991. Although these trips were open to passengers, the extension and its stops did not open for full-time service until June 19, 1993.

In March 2014, Muni released details of the proposed implementation of their Transit Effectiveness Project (later rebranded MuniForward), which included a variety of stop changes for the J Church line. No changes were proposed for San Jose and Randall.

References

External links 

SFMTA: San Jose Ave & Randall St inbound and outbound
SF Bay Transit (unofficial): San Jose Ave & Randall St

Muni Metro stations
Railway stations in the United States opened in 1991